Cangandala National Park is a national park in Malanje Province, Angola. It is situated between the Cuije river and 2 unnamed territories of the Cuanza, with the towns of Culamagia and Techongolola on the edges of the park. It is the smallest national park in Angola.

History
The park was created in 1963 while Angola was a territory under Portuguese rule. It was declared a national park on 25 June 1970. Cangandala was founded to protect the Giant Sable Antelope which were discovered in 1963.

Description
No perennial rivers occur and drainage takes place via grass covered waterlanes. A mosaic of open miombo bushveld and savanna occur. Brachystegia-bushveld are found on the water partitions and open grasslands in the lower-lying drainage lanes.

The red-lipped herald is one of the commonest snakes in the park.

Forest vegetation is dominated by Brachystegia and Julbernardia, together with other trees in places (Piliostigma, Burkea, Monotes, Strychnos, Sterculia and Dombeya).

See also

References

External links
 Birdlife.org profile of Cangandala National Park

Angolan miombo woodlands
National parks of Angola
Buildings and structures in Malanje Province
Protected areas established in 1963
1963 establishments in Angola
Western Congolian forest–savanna mosaic